Roswell: The Aliens Attack is a 1999 made-for-television film produced for the United Paramount Network. The story is about two aliens who escape from Roswell, New Mexico, in 1947 with intentions to blow up the earth. Roswell: The Aliens Attack was filmed in Winnipeg, Manitoba, Canada. The film was released on VHS a while after the airing on television. In 2011, CBS Home Entertainment (distributed by Paramount Home Media Distribution) released the film on DVD for the first time.

Cast
 Steven Flynn as John Dearman
 Kate Greenhouse as Katie Harras
 Heather Hanson as Eve Flowers
 Brent Stait as Capt. Philips
 Sean McCann as Col. Woodburn
 Donnelly Rhodes as Tyler
 Ben Baxter as Sam Harras

See also
List of television films produced for UPN

External links
 

1999 television films
1999 films
1999 science fiction films
Alien invasions in films
Canadian science fiction television films
Films scored by Fred Mollin
Films set in 1947
Films set in New Mexico
Films directed by Brad Turner
Roswell incident in fiction
UFO-related television
1990s English-language films
1990s Canadian films
UPN original films